Odd Fellows Hall, Independent Order of Odd Fellows Building, IOOF Building, Odd Fellows Lodge and variations are buildings for a chapter of the Independent Order of Odd Fellows fraternal organization.

These terms may, more specifically, refer to:

Australia 
Glennie Hall, Warwick, Queensland
IOOF Building (Adelaide), South Australia
Jager Stores in Toodyay, Western Australia, which was an Oddfellows Hall from 1897 to 1908

Canada 
Odd Fellows Hall (Victoria, British Columbia)
IOOF Hall (Toronto), Ontario

United Kingdom 
Oddfellows' Hall, Barton-upon-Humber
Oddfellows' Hall, Chester
Oddfellows' Hall, Devizes
Oddfellows Hall, Edinburgh now used as a public house

United States 
Ordered by state, then city

A 
Oddfellows Hall (Fairbanks, Alaska), NRHP-listed in Fairbanks, Alaska
IOOF Building (Kingman, Arizona), listed on the National Register of Historic Places (NRHP) in Mohave County, Arizona
Independent Order of Odd Fellows Building (Benton, Arkansas), NRHP-listed in Saline County, Arkansas
Independent Order of OddFellows Building (Safford, Arizona), listed on the NRHP-Safford Annex

C 
Arroyo Grande IOOF Hall, Arroyo Grande, California, NRHP-listed
Odd Fellows Hall (Eureka, California), NRHP-listed
Odd Fellows Hall (Gonzales, California), NRHP-listed
Odd Fellows Hall (La Grange, California), NRHP-listed
I.O.O.F. Hall (Mokelumne Hill, California), NRHP-listed in Calaveras County, California
Odd Fellows Temple (Pasadena, California), NRHP-listed in Pasadena, California
Odd Fellows Building (Red Bluff, California), NRHP-listed in Tehama County, California
Independent Order of Odd Fellows Building (San Diego, California), NRHP-listed
Odd Fellows Hall (Santa Ana, California), NRHP-listed
I.O.O.F. Hall (Woodbridge, California), NRHP-listed in San Joaquin County, California
I.O.O.F. Building (Woodland, California), NRHP-listed in Yolo County, California
IOOF Hall (De Beque, Colorado), NRHP-listed

D 
Odd Fellows Hall (Washington, D.C.), 8th & D Streets NW, Washington, D.C., also a venue for Georgetown Hoyas men's basketball

G 
Odd Fellows Building and Auditorium, listed on the NRHP in the Sweet Auburn Historic District of Atlanta, Georgia

I 
Independent Order of Odd Fellows Hall (Ashton, Idaho), listed on the NRHP in Fremont County, Idaho
I.O.O.F. Hall (Challis, Idaho), listed on the NRHP in Custer County, Idaho
I.O.O.F. Building (Idaho Falls, Idaho), listed on the NRHP in Bonneville County, Idaho
Montpelier Odd Fellows Hall, Montpelier, Idaho, listed on the NRHP in Bear Lake County, Idaho
Odd Fellows Hall (Salmon, Idaho), built 1874, listed on the NRHP in Lemhi County, Idaho
Salmon Odd Fellows Hall, Salmon, Idaho, built 1907, listed on the NRHP in Lemhi County, Idaho
Cedar Falls Independent Order of Odd Fellows, Cedar Falls, Iowa, NRHP-listed
Wupperman Block/I.O.O.F. Hall, Davenport, Iowa, listed on the NRHP in Scott County, Iowa
 I.O.O.F. Hall (Dunlap, Iowa), listed on the NRHP in Harrison County, Iowa
I.O.O.F. Hall (Garnavillo, Iowa), listed on the NRHP in Clayton County, Iowa
Odd Fellows Hall (Monticello, Iowa), listed on the NRHP in Jones County, Iowa
Odd Fellows Hall (Troy Mills, Iowa), listed on the NRHP in Linn County, Iowa

K 
IOOF Lodge (Alton, Kansas), listed on the NRHP in Osborne County, Kansas
Inman I.O.O.F. Hall, Inman, Kansas, listed on the NRHP in McPherson County, Kansas
Odd Fellows Hall (Covington, Kentucky), listed on the NRHP in Kenton County, Kentucky
Odd Fellows Temple (Lexington, Kentucky), listed on the NRHP in Fayette County, Kentucky
Odd Fellows Building (Owensboro, Kentucky), listed on the NRHP in Daviess County, Kentucky
Odd Fellows Building (Pikeville, Kentucky), listed on the NRHP in Pike County, Kentucky

M 
Brooklin IOOF Hall, Brooklin, Maine, listed on the NRHP in Hancock County, Maine
Odd Fellows-Rebekah Hall (Cornish, Maine), listed on the NRHP in York County, Maine
Odd Fellows Block (Lewiston, Maine), listed on the NRHP in Androscoggin County, Maine
West Paris Lodge No. 15, I.O.O.F., West Paris, Maine, listed on the NRHP in Oxford County, Maine
Odd Fellows Hall (Baltimore, 1831), built in 1831, demolished in 1890
Odd Fellows Hall (Baltimore, 1891), listed on the NRHP in Baltimore County, Maryland
Odd Fellows Lodge (Bel Air, Maryland), listed on the NRHP in Harford County, Maryland

Odd Fellows' Hall (Beverly, Massachusetts), listed on the NRHP in Essex County, Massachusetts
Odd Fellows' Hall (Buckland, Massachusetts), listed on the NRHP in Franklin County, Massachusetts
Odd Fellows Hall (Cambridge, Massachusetts), listed on the NRHP in Middlesex County, Massachusetts
Odd Fellows Building (Malden, Massachusetts), listed on the NRHP in Middlesex County, Massachusetts
Odd Fellows Valley Lodge No. 189 Building, listed on the NRHP in Bay County, Michigan
St. Charles Odd Fellows Hall, St. Charles, Missouri, listed on the NRHP in St. Charles County, Missouri
IOOF Hall and Fromberg Co-operative Mercantile Building, Fromberg, Montana, listed on the NRHP in Carbon County, Montana
IOOF Hall (Stevensville, Montana), listed on the NRHP in Ravalli County, Montana
IOOF Lodge (Thompson Falls, Montana), listed on the NRHP in Sanders County, Montana

N 
IOOF Hall and Opera House, Bladen, Nebraska, listed on the NRHP in Webster County, Nebraska
IOOF Hall (Hunter, New York), listed on the NRHP in Greene County, New York
Odd Fellows Hall (New York, New York), listed on the NRHP in New York
Odd Fellows Lodge (Goldsboro, North Carolina), listed on the NRHP in Wayne County, North Carolina
Odd Fellows Building (Raleigh, North Carolina), listed on the NRHP in Wake County, North Carolina
Odd Fellows Block (Grand Forks, North Dakota), listed on the NRHP in Grand Forks County, North Dakota

O 
Odd Fellows Hall (Hilliard, Ohio), listed on the NRHP in Franklin County, Ohio
Odd Fellows Temple (East Liverpool, Ohio), listed on the NRHP in Columbiana County, Ohio
Odd Fellows Hall (Portsmouth, Ohio), listed on the NRHP in Scioto County, Ohio
Odd Fellows Hall (Sandusky, Ohio), listed on the NRHP in Erie County, Ohio
I.O.O.F. Hall (Alva, Oklahoma), listed on the NRHP in Woods County, Oklahoma
Adams Odd Fellows Hall, Adams, Oregon, listed on the NRHP in Umatilla County, Oregon
IOOF Building (Ashland, Oregon), listed on the NRHP in Jackson County, Oregon
Clatskanie IOOF Hall, Clatskanie, Oregon, listed on the NRHP in Columbia County
Enterprise IOOF Hall, Enterprise, Oregon, listed on the NRHP in Wallowa County
Harrisburg Odd Fellows Hall, Harrisburg, Oregon, listed on the NRHP in Linn County, Oregon
Lake Oswego Odd Fellows Hall, Lake Oswego, Oregon, listed on the NRHP in Clackamas County, Oregon
Odd Fellows Building (Portland, Oregon), listed on the NRHP in Multnomah County, Oregon

R 
Oddfellows' Hall (East Providence, Rhode Island), listed on the NRHP in Providence County, Rhode Island

S 
Odd Fellows Building (Gary, South Dakota), listed on the NRHP in Deuel County, South Dakota
IOOF Hall (Fairburn, South Dakota)

U 
Odd Fellows Hall (Beaver, Utah), listed on the NRHP in Beaver County, Utah
Independent Order of Odd Fellows Hall (Salt Lake City, Utah), listed on the NRHP in Salt Lake County, Utah

V 
Odd Fellows Hall (Alexandria, Virginia), listed on the NRHP in Virginia
Odd Fellows Hall (Blacksburg, Virginia), listed on the NRHP in Montgomery County, Virginia
Odd Fellows Hall (Occoquan, Virginia)

W 
Cheney Odd Fellows Hall, Cheney, Washington, listed on the NRHP in Spokane County, Washington
Vashon Odd Fellows Hall, Vashon Washington
Odd Fellows Hall (Big Horn, Wyoming), listed on the NRHP in Sheridan County, Wyoming

See also
List of Odd Fellows buildings
 Odd Fellows (disambiguation)
 Oddfellows - Oddfellows in the U.K.
 Independent Order of Odd Fellows - Odd Fellows in the U.S.

For shorter, specifically named lists:
 Independent Order of Odd Fellows Building (disambiguation)
 Independent Order of Odd Fellows Hall (disambiguation)
 IOOF Building (disambiguation)
 Odd Fellows Block (disambiguation)
 Odd Fellows Building (disambiguation)
 Odd Fellows Lodge (disambiguation)
 Odd Fellows Temple (disambiguation)